Inal Batuvych Ardzinba (born 26 July 1990) is the current Minister for Foreign Affairs of Abkhazia.

According to Yevgeny Yasin, former president of Abkhazia Vladislav Ardzinba is Inal Ardzinba's uncle.

Beginning in 2014, Ardzinba worked in the Presidential Administration of Russia, eventually becoming deputy of Vladislav Surkov, then an Assistant to the President of the Russian Federation. 

Since 2014, as an official of the Presidential Administration of Russia, he has been dealing with issues of interaction with Ukraine and the self-proclaimed Donetsk People's Republic and Luhansk People's Republic.

In May 2015, the Security Service of Ukraine submitted to the Prosecutor General's Office materials on Ardzinba's involvement in terrorist activities on the territory of Ukraine.

On November 6, 2015, the Prosecutor's Office of the Odessa region began an investigation in absentia against Inal Ardzinba in connection with an attempt to change the state borders of Ukraine.

In November 2015 Ukraine put Ardzinba on the international wanted list for violating the country's constitutional order. This information was confirmed by the Deputy Prosecutor General of Ukraine David Sakvarelidze.

In December 2015, Ardzinba was accused by the Ukrainian authorities of trying to destabilize the situation in southern Ukraine, in Bessarabia.

On June 10, 2016, the head of the Security Service of Ukraine Vasyl Hrytsak announced that a criminal case was being conducted against Ardzinba in connection with his involvement in an attempt to create the Bessarabian People's Republic in the Odessa region of Ukraine - the formation of Pro-Putin's separatists similar to the Donetsk People's Republic and Luhansk People's Republic.

In 2016, he played a prominent role in the Surkov leaks.

Ardzinba pleads for the BRICS to play a leading role in world politics, after Russia was expelled from the Group of Eight. 

In January 2020, Ardzinba founded the Future of Abkhazia party. Until then he was considered to be close to the party Amtsakhara. Shortly thereafter, Ardzinba supported then-opposition candidate Aslan Bzhania in the 2020 Abkhazian presidential election.

In 2021, president Bzhania appointed Ardzinba to be the foreign minister of Abkhazia. His appointment was a surprise for many experts on the region. He is the youngest man to ever hold the office. After he was elected, he said that the deepening of cooperation with Russia is a priority for Abkhazia’s foreign policy.

In January 2022, Ardzinba stopped the EU's and UNDP's confidence-building COBERM program in Abkhazia.

In July 2022, Ardzinba proposed to move the Geneva International Discussions "to another more neutral city" like Minsk or Istanbul.

See also
List of foreign ministers in 2021
List of current foreign ministers

References

External links

 Minister of Foreign Affairs of the Republic of Abkhazia (from the homepage of the Ministry of Foreign Affairs of Abkhazia)
 Inal Ardzinba – Roadmap to Kremlin's Policy in Abkhazia and the Tskhinvali Region

1990 births
Living people
Ministers for Foreign Affairs of Abkhazia
People from Sukhumi